Robat-e Qarah Bil (also Romanized as Robāţ-e Qarah Bīl, Rebāţ-e-Qarehbīl, Ribāt-i-Qarabīl, and Robāţ-e Qareh Bīl) is a village in Golestan Rural District, in the Central District of Jajrom County, North Khorasan Province, Iran. At the 2006 census, its population was 788, in 194 families.

References 

Populated places in Jajrom County